Robert "Rob" Evan is an American actor and singer, best known as the lead performer in numerous Broadway musicals, a performer in national and international tours of musical productions, and a featured vocalist on various music albums.

Personal life
Evan, a native of Monticello, Georgia, said in a personal interview:"I grew up in Monticello, Georgia, and I was a football player at UGA, and that's the first time I saw Les Mis — twenty years ago here at the Fox. It just made me go, I want to do this for a living. I was just a business major, I had wanted to go to law school, but this show lit the fire... I ended up auditioning at a Les Mis open call 'a la American Idol' two years later. I waited ten hours to sing sixteen bars of Stars. He walked out with the proverbial gold ticket. 'I thought it was going to be instant stardom and cash, not knowing any better." 

In 1989, he was the first recipient of the Georgia Music Hall of Fame Talent Award. He walked on to the varsity football team as a kicker/punter at the University of Georgia, where he majored in Finance and graduated with a Bachelor of Business Administration (BBA) in 1990.

Family
He met his ex-wife, Beate, while working on a cruise ship as one of four lead singers in a musical review. Beate is originally from Norway. Shortly after his time on the ship, he moved to New York City to pursue a career on Broadway. During his early days in New York City, Evan waited tables in Times Square. He and Beate have three children.

Musical theater
Evan has performed in many musical theater productions. He was in the 1995 US tour of Jekyll & Hyde as Theo Davenport. Most notably, he played the title roles in the original Broadway production of Jekyll & Hyde for over three years, from the years 1997 until 2000, and over 600 performances. One of his performances was professionally recorded as a rehearsal for the DVD version with David Hasselhoff and is currently available on YouTube.

He has continued to perform in touring productions of the show. Evan has appeared alongside Linda Eder, Luba Mason, Coleen Sexton, Christiane Noll, Anastasia Barzee and Andrea Rivette, as his leading ladies.

After a few community theater roles, his first professional role was in the ensemble for South Pacific in Atlanta, Georgia in 1990.

He appeared in multiple productions of Les Misérables, including on Broadway and at the Fox Theater in Atlanta, Georgia. His roles include Jean Valjean and Enjolras.

Off-Broadway, he created the roles of "The Dancin' Kid" in Johnny Guitar, and "Miles Hendon" in the musical The Prince and the Pauper.

In 2004, he played "Orin Scrivello" in Little Shop of Horrors with Joey Fatone on Broadway.

He also performed the role of the Count von Krolock in the Broadway show called Dance of the Vampires at the Minskoff Theatre in 2002. This show is separate and very different from the show by that name that has been performed in Europe and elsewhere. An understudy to Michael Crawford, he did perform the role on stage for at least one show. He originated the role of Nanki-Poo in the TUTS/Pittsburgh CLO premiere of the Hot Mikado.

Other musicals in which he has appeared include Hello, Dolly!, By George!, Three Penny, Jesus Christ Superstar, Brigadoon, Desert Song, Chess, The Civil War, and others.

He has been in a touring show, The Music of Andrew Lloyd Webber, and Neil Berg's 100 Years of Broadway.

On March 26, 2007, he began performing as "Kerchak" in the Disney Broadway musical Tarzan. He played his final performance on July 8, 2007, when the show closed.

In August 2014, he joined the cast of Atomic, an off-Broadway musical about the Manhattan Project, as Ernest Rutherford and Arthur Compton.

Trans-Siberian Orchestra

Evan can be heard on Trans-Siberian Orchestra's albums The Lost Christmas Eve ("What Is Christmas?", "Back to a Reason Part II", and "What Child Is This?") and Night Castle ("There Was a Life", "Epiphany"). In an interview Evan said, "Paul has really been brilliant in the way he handled that band. I have three platinum records on my wall because of him. In fact, the house they’re hanging in is because of the last TSO record we did", referring to Paul O'Neill. Evan has also toured live with TSO, singing "This Is Who You Are" in 2001; "An Angel Came Down", "An Angel Returned", and "The World That He Sees" in 2003; "An Angel Came Down" and "An Angel Returned" in 2009; "What is Christmas?", "Back to a Reason Part II", and "What Child Is This?" in winter 2012 and 2013; "Epiphany" and "Mephistopheles' Return" in spring 2014; "The World That He Sees" and "Christmas in the Air" in winter 2014; "What Child Is This?" in winter 2015 and 2016; as well as playing the part of Beethoven on TSO's spring 2010, 2011, and 2012 tours. Evan's vocals garnered him rave reviews from both TSO fans and musical critics. "Hard Rock Magazine," not only lauded him for his portrayal of the legendary composer in Beethoven's Last Night performed in 2011 in Beethoven's home town of Vienna, Austria but also noted that he had "the best songs on "Night Castle," (Epiphany and There was a Life) were not his by chance."

The Dream Engine
Evan was one of the two lead vocalists for The Dream Engine, a music performance group that performed the music of Jim Steinman. This project has not performed or been active in public since 2006, aside from having a website and Myspace page.

At live shows for The Dream Engine, Evan has performed solo vocals on the songs "What Part of My Body Hurts The Most", "(It Hurts) Only When I Feel", "Is Nothing Sacred", "Two Out of Three Ain't Bad", "For Crying Out Loud" and "Speaking In Tongues". As duets with Adrienne Warren, he has performed the songs "Not Allowed to Love" and the revised "Braver Than We Are" (alternate titles have been "An American Elegy" and "God's Gone AWOL"). He has performed "Loving You's a Dirty Job but Somebody's Gotta Do It" as a duet with Bonnie Tyler and Elaine Caswell. He performed one of three vocal parts in "Objects in the Rear View Mirror May Appear Closer than They Are", and one of the four vocal parts in "We're Still the Children We Once Were". In 2005, before The Dream Engine had officially formed, Evan performed at a set of shows called Over the Top, featuring the music of Jim Steinman. In addition to some of the songs mentioned above, he also performed at these shows "I'd Do Anything for Love (But I Won't Do That)", "Heaven Can Wait", "A Kiss Is a Terrible Thing to Waste", "Read 'Em and Weep", "Rock and Roll Dreams Come Through" and the original "Braver Than We Are".

Rocktopia
Evan co-created with Maestro Randall Craig Fleischer Rocktopia, a mix of classical music and classic rock, which in March 2018 began a six-week run at the Broadway Theatre. Its featured vocalists include Evan, Alyson Cambridge, Chloe Lowery, Kimberly Nichole, and Tony Vincent, as well as Celtic violinist Máiréad Nesbitt, guitarist Tony Bruno, a 5-piece rock band, a 20-piece orchestra, and a 40-member choir.

Recordings
Evan's voice can be heard on multiple recordings, including Trans-Siberian Orchestra’s The Lost Christmas Eve and Night Castle (Lava/Atlantic), Jekyll & Hyde (OBC/Atlantic), The Broadway Musicals of 1940 (BayView), The Prince and the Pauper (OOBC/JAY), Johnny Guitar (OOBC), Jekyll & Hyde: Resurrection (KOCH/Globalvision), Dracula (KOCH/Globalvision), the soundtrack to Neil Berg's 100 Years of Broadway (Left Field Productions), and Menrva Realm's Angels (Ectronia).

In 2005/06 he did vocal work on studio recordings intended for The Dream Engine. Sample clips from "Nowhere Fast" and "Is Nothing Sacred" were posted to the Internet, but the album was never released.

Other appearances
Evan performed at the 2001 Inaugural Gala for President George W. Bush, the Millennium Independence Day US Naval Revue aboard the USS JFK for President Clinton, the Millennium World Forum Conference with guest speaker Mikhail Gorbachev, the 1998 Goodwill Games, the New York City Mayor’s Inaugural Gala, the 1998 and 1999 NY Yankees World Series Celebration at City Hall, The Georgia Music Hall of Fame Awards Telecast in September 2006, The Today Show, and Monday Night Football.

In 2008, Evan sang the song "If I Should Lose My Way" as a duet with Trisha Yearwood, and the song "The Last Waltz for Dixie" as a solo, in a show of songs and dialog from Frank Wildhorn's The Civil War. President George W. Bush and First Lady Laura Bush were present. The show was done to benefit the Ford's Theater in Washington, D.C.

In 2009, he performed in The Rock Tenor, which featured Patti Russo, and in Classic M: The Music of Motown, USA. While appearing in The Rock Tenor shows, Evan performed the song "Paradise by the Dashboard Light" as a duet with Russo.

He has appeared in the soap opera All My Children on ABC.

Notable theatre roles

Discography

References

External links
 Official website for Rob Evan
 Official myspace page for The Dream Engine, includes audio samples of Rob Evan's singing voice
 Official website for The Rock Tenor
 Official website for Menrva Realm
 Interview with Rob Evan

Year of birth missing (living people)
Living people
People from Monticello, Georgia
American male singers
American male musical theatre actors
Georgia Bulldogs football players